The Yokosuka MXY-7  was a purpose-built, rocket-powered human-guided kamikaze attack aircraft employed by Japan against Allied ships towards the end of the Pacific War during World War II. Although extremely fast, the very short range of the Ohka meant that it had to be carried into action as a parasite aircraft by a much larger bomber, which was itself vulnerable to carrier-borne fighters. In action during the Battle of Okinawa in 1945, Ohkas were able to sink or damage some escort vessels and transport ships but no major warships were ever sunk. Improved versions which attempted to overcome the aircraft's shortcomings were developed too late to be deployed. Allied troops referred to the aircraft as "Baka Bombs".

Design and development
The MXY-7 Navy Suicide Attacker Ohka was a manned flying bomb that was usually carried underneath a Mitsubishi G4M2e Model 24J "Betty" bomber to within range of its target. On release, the pilot would first glide towards the target and when close enough he would fire the Ohkas three solid-fuel rockets, one at a time or in unison, and fly the missile towards the ship that he intended to destroy.

The design was conceived by Ensign Mitsuo Ohta of the 405th Kōkūtai, aided by students of the Aeronautical Research Institute at the University of Tokyo. Ohta submitted his plans to the Yokosuka research facility. The Imperial Japanese Navy decided the idea had merit and Yokosuka engineers of the Yokosuka Naval Air Technical Arsenal (Dai-Ichi Kaigun Koku Gijitsusho, or in short Kugisho) created formal blueprints for what was to be the MXY7. The only variant which saw service was the Model 11, and it was powered by three Type 4 Mark 1 Model 20 rockets. 155 Ohka Model 11s were built at Yokosuka, and another 600 were built at the Kasumigaura Naval Air Arsenal.

Later versions were designed to be launched from coastal air bases and caves, and even from submarines equipped with aircraft catapults, although none were actually used in this way. The   was the first Allied ship to be sunk by Ohka aircraft, near Okinawa on 12 April 1945. Over the course of the war, Ohkas sank or damaged three ships beyond repair, significantly damaged three more ships, with a total of seven U.S. ships damaged or sunk by Ohkas.

The Ohka pilots, members of the Jinrai Butai (Thunder Gods Corps), are honored in Japan at Ohka Park in Kashima City, the Ohka Monument in Kanoya City, the Kamakura Ohka Monument at Kenchō-ji Zen temple in Kamakura, Kanagawa, and the Yasukuni Shrine in Tokyo.

The only operational Ohka was the Model 11. Essentially a   bomb with wooden wings, powered by three Type 4 Model 1 Mark 20 solid-fuel rocket motors, the Model 11 achieved great speed, but with limited range. This was problematic, as it required the slow, heavily laden mother aircraft to approach within  of the target, making it very vulnerable to defending fighters. There was one experimental variant of the Model 11, the Model 21, which had thin steel wings manufactured by Nakajima. It had the engine of the Model 11 and the airframe of the Model 22.

The Ohka K-1 was an unpowered trainer version with water ballast instead of warhead and engines, that was used to provide pilots with handling experience. Unlike the combat aircraft, it was also fitted with flaps and a landing skid. Forty-five were built by Dai-Ichi Kaigun Koku Gijitsusho.

The Model 22 was designed to overcome the short standoff distance problem by using a Campini-type motorjet engine, the Ishikawajima Tsu-11. This engine was successfully tested, and 50 Model 22 Ohkas were built at Yokosuka to accept this engine. The Model 22 was to be launched by the more agile Yokosuka P1Y3 Ginga "Frances" bomber, necessitating a shorter wing span and much smaller  warhead. The first flight of a Model 22 Ohka took place in June 1945; none appear to have been used operationally, and only approximately 20 of the experimental Tsu-11 engines are known to have been produced.

The Model 33 was a larger version of the Model 22 powered by an Ishikawajima Ne-20 turbojet with an  warhead. The mothership was to be the Nakajima G8N Renzan. The Model 33 was cancelled due to the likelihood that the Renzan would not be available.

Other unbuilt planned variants were the Model 43A with folding wings, to be launched from submarines, and the Model 43B, a catapult/rocket assisted version, also with folding wings so that it could be hidden in caves. A trainer version was also under development for this version, the two-seat Model 43 K-1 Kai Wakazakura (Young Cherry), fitted with a single rocket motor. In place of the warhead, a second seat was installed for the student pilot. Two of this version were built. Finally, the Model 53 would also use the Ne-20 turbojet, but was to be towed like a glider and released near its target.

Operational history

The Yokosuka MXY7 Ohka was used mostly against U.S. ships invading Okinawa, and if launched from its mothership, could be effective because of its high speed in the dive.

Attacks intensified in April 1945. On 1 April 1945, six G4Ms attacked the U.S. fleet off Okinawa. At least one made a successful attack; its Ohka was thought to have hit one of the 406 mm (16 in) turrets on the battleship , causing moderate damage. Postwar analysis indicated that no hits were recorded and that a near-miss took place. None of the G4Ms returned.

The U.S. military quickly realized the danger and concentrated on extending their "defensive rings" outward to intercept the G4M/Ohka combination aircraft before the suicide mission could be launched. On 12 April 1945, nine G4Ms attacked the U.S. fleet off Okinawa. The destroyer  was hit, broke in two, and sank.  destroyed an Ohka with AA fire 45 m (50 yd) from the ship, but the resulting explosion was still powerful enough to cause extensive damage, forcing Jeffers to withdraw. The destroyer  was attacked by two Ohkas. One struck above the waterline just behind the ship's bow, its charge passing completely through the hull and splashing into the sea, where it detonated underwater, causing little damage to the ship. The other Ohka narrowly missed (its pilot probably killed by anti-aircraft fire) and crashed into the sea, knocking off the Stanlys ensign in the process. One Betty returned. On 14 April 1945, seven G4Ms attacked the U.S. fleet off Okinawa. None returned. None of the Ohkas appeared to have been launched. Two days later, six G4Ms attacked the U.S. fleet off Okinawa. Two returned, but no Ohkas had hit their targets. Later, on 28 April 1945, four G4Ms attacked the U.S. fleet off Okinawa at night. One returned. No hits were recorded.

May 1945 saw another series of attacks. On 4 May 1945, seven G4Ms attacked the U.S. fleet off Okinawa. One Ohka hit the bridge of a destroyer, causing extensive damage and casualties.  was also damaged by an Ohkas near miss. One G4M returned. On 11 May 1945, four G4Ms attacked the U.S. fleet off Okinawa. The destroyer  was hit and suffered extensive damage and flooding. The vessel was judged beyond repair. On 25 May 1945, 11 G4Ms attacked the fleet off Okinawa. Bad weather forced most of the aircraft to turn back, and none of the others hit targets.

On 22 June 1945, six G4Ms attacked the fleet. Two returned, but no hits were recorded. Postwar analysis concluded that the Ohkas impact was negligible, since no U.S. Navy capital ships had been hit during the attacks because of the effective defensive tactics that were employed. In total, of the 300 Ohka available for the Okinawa campaign, 74 actually undertook operations, of which 56 were either destroyed with their parent aircraft or in making attacks. The Allied nickname for the aircraft was "Baka", a Japanese word meaning "foolish" or "idiotic".

Variants

MXY-7 Rocket powered suicide attacker, unpowered glider prototypes; ten built

Navy Suicide Attacker Ohka Model 11 Long designation of the operational attacker

Ohka Model 11 Suicide attacker powered by 3 ×  Navy Type 4 Mark 1 Model 20 solid-fueled rocket motors, firing for 8–10 seconds; 755 built

Ohka Model 21 Suicide attacker, fitted with steel-built wings built by Nakajima; one built

Ohka Model 22 Suicide attacker, powered by an Ishikawajima Tsu-11 thermo-jet engine with reduced span wings and  warhead, to be carried by Yokosuka P1Y1 Ginga bombers. 50 built by the 

Ohka Model 33 Suicide attacker, powered by an Ishikawajima Ne-20 turbojet engine, with an  warhead, to be carried by the Nakajima G8N1 Renzan bomber

Ohka Model 43A Ko Suicide attacker, powered by a Ne-20 turbojet engine, with folding wings, to be catapult launched from submarines

Ohka Model 43B Otsu Suicide attacker similar to the Model 43A for catapult launching from caves

Ohka Model 53 Suicide attacker for aerotow launch, powered by a Ne-20 turbojet engine

Ohka K-1 Suicide attack training glider

Ohka Model 43 K-1  Two-seat suicide attack glider trainer with flaps and retractable skid undercarriage, fitted with a single Type 4 Mark 1 Model 20 rocket motor, for limited powered flight

"Suzuka-24" (Japanese designation unknown) Alleged interceptor version with warhead replaced by a fuel tank and two 20 mm cannon mounted on top. Supposedly employed at least twice against B-29 formations in April 1945

Surviving aircraft

India
 Model 11 on static display at the Indian Air Force Museum in Palam, New Delhi.

Japan
On display
 Model 11 on static display at Iruma Air Force Base in Iruma, Saitama.
 On static display at the Kawaguchiko Motor Museum in Narusawa, Yamanashi.
 Model 11 on static display at Usashi Heiwa Museum in Usa, Oita

United Kingdom
On display
 Model 11 on static display at the Fleet Air Arm Museum in Yeovilton, Somerset.
 Model 11 on static display at the Imperial War Museum in London.
 Model 11 on static display at the Royal Air Force Museum Cosford in Cosford, Shropshire.
 Model 11 on static display at the Science and Industry Museum in Manchester.

United States
On display
 Model 11 on static display at the National Museum of the Marine Corps in Triangle, Virginia.
 Model 11 on static display at the Planes of Fame Air Museum in Chino, California.
 Model 11 on static display at the Yanks Air Museum in Chino, California.
 Model 22 on static display at the Steven F. Udvar-Hazy Center of the National Air and Space Museum in Chantilly, Virginia.
 Model 43B K-1 Kai Wakazakura on static display at the Pima Air & Space Museum in Tucson, Arizona. It is on loan from the National Air and Space Museum.
 K-1 on static display at the National Museum of the United States Air Force in Dayton, Ohio.
 K-1 on static display at the National Museum of the U.S. Navy in Washington, D.C.

Replicas on display

Japan
 Model 11 on static display at the Yūshūkan of the Yasukuni Shrine in Tokyo.

United States
 Model 11 on static display at the National Warplane Museum in Geneseo, New York.

Specifications (Ohka 11)

See also

References

Notes

Bibliography

 Ellis, Ken. Wreck & Relics, 23rd Edition Manchester: Crecy Publishing Ltd, 2012. 
 
 
 Maloney, Edward T. and the Aeronautical Staff of Aero Publishers, Inc. Kamikaze (Aero Series 7). Fallbrook, California: Aero Publishers, Inc., 1966.
 .
 
 Sheftall, M.G. Blossoms in the Wind: Human Legacies of the Kamikaze. New York: New American Library, 2005. .
 Stafford, Edward P. Little Ship, Big War: The Saga of DE343. Annapolis, Maryland: Naval Institute Press, 2000. .

External links

 "Baka... Flying Warhead", C.I.C. (Combat Information Center), U.S. Office of the Chief of Naval Operations, June 1945.
 USS LSM(R)-193
 Popular Science,August 1945, Japanese Gamble On Human Bombs
  The History of Kamikaze Ohka 桜花 
 The Mysterious Second Seat – Air & Space Magazine

1940s Japanese attack aircraft
Kamikaze
Parasite aircraft
World War II suicide weapons of Japan
MXY7
Rocket-powered aircraft
Aircraft first flown in 1944